Reginald Norman Morgan Empey, Baron Empey,  (born 26 October 1947), best known as Reg Empey, is a Unionist politician from Northern Ireland, who was the leader of the Ulster Unionist Party (UUP) from 2005 to 2010. He  was  the chairman of the Ulster Unionist Party from 2012 to 2019. Empey was also twice Lord Mayor of Belfast and was a Member of the Northern Ireland Assembly (MLA) for East Belfast from 1998 to 2011.

Biography

Early life
Reg Empey was born in West Belfast on 26 October 1947. His family were retailers, and his uncle was Stormont Ulster Unionist MP Joseph Morgan. Empey attended Hillcrest Preparatory School, Belfast, and The Royal School, Armagh, before graduating with an economics degree from Queen's University of Belfast, where his contemporaries included the future MP Bernadette Devlin. After that he built up a business career, specifically in retailing. His Royal Avenue store, located opposite the British Army barracks, was destroyed in an explosion, and looted. 

He first entered politics in the late 1960s when he joined the Ulster Young Unionist Council. Along with other hardline unionists, he left in protest at reforms and became an early member of the Vanguard Progressive Unionist Party, serving as the party chairman in 1975 and being elected to the Constitutional Convention in the same year. 

When Vanguard split during the Northern Ireland Constitutional Convention, Empey joined the breakaway group which formed the United Ulster Unionist Party, serving as the party's deputy leader from 1977 until its dissolution in 1984.

Ulster Unionist Party
Empey then rejoined the Ulster Unionist Party (UUP). He was elected to Belfast City Council, serving as Lord Mayor in 1989–1990 and 1993–1994. 

He was appointed an Officer of the Order of the British Empire (OBE) in the 1994 New Year Honours for services to local government.

During this period Empey built up a political base in East Belfast, but in 1995 he sought to become the Ulster Unionists' candidate for the North Down by-election. He was not selected by North Down party members, losing out to Alan McFarland. 

Empey became increasingly prominent in the UUP and was often a member of its negotiating teams throughout the 1990s, the decade when he first became a party officer, and he became a key ally of David Trimble, who became leader of the party in 1995. Trimble had been deputy leader of Vanguard in the years after the divide. In 1996, Empey was elected to the Northern Ireland Forum for East Belfast and in 1998 and 2003 he was elected to the Northern Ireland Assembly.

Executive career
When the Northern Ireland Executive was formed in 1999, Empey became Minister of Enterprise, Trade and Investment, holding the portfolio throughout the entirety of the Executive's existence. In June 2001 Trimble temporarily resigned as First Minister of Northern Ireland and appointed Empey to fulfil the functions of the office for the interim period until disagreements between the parties had been resolved. He  undertook the role until November of that year. In 1999, Empey was knighted by Queen Elizabeth II.

He was the Minister for Employment and Learning from 2007 to 2010. He called for the Treasury to compensate investors in the collapsed mutual society Presbyterian Mutual which the Treasury rejected.

In October 2011, he welcomed the news that the National Transitional Council of Libya had agreed compensate victims of IRA bombings. He said the many shipments of arms sent to Ireland by Colonel Gaddafi for IRA use, were 'tantamount to an act of war against the United Kingdom.'

Leadership
In 2005, Trimble resigned as leader following a disastrous showing by the UUP in the 2005 general election. Empey stood in the contest to succeed him and on 24 June 2005, was elected. In a reversal of fortunes, his main opponent was Alan McFarland, to whom he had lost the by-election nomination ten years earlier.

Personal life
Reg and Stella Empey have two children. Empey is a member of the Orange Order, his lodge being Eldon LOL 7, in the Belfast district.

Election results
Empey first stood for election in the 1975 elections to the Constitutional Convention, standing as a candidate in Belfast East for the Vanguard Unionist Progressive Party he received 4657 first preference votes he was elected.  In the 1977 Local Government elections he received 981 first preference votes and was unsuccessful (he did not run in the 1981 Local Government Elections), and the 1982 Assembly election he received 503 first preference votes. 

In the 1985 Local Government election, he was elected to Belfast City Council with 1117 first preference votes, this was reduced in the subsequent 1989 local government election to 864. 

In 1993 he was elected having attained 1295 first preference votes, and was elected again in 1997 with 2309 first preference votes. However this still left him behind his main DUP rival in the Pottinger Electoral Area, Sammy Wilson.

He was a senior Ulster Unionist negotiator for the Good Friday Agreement.

Empey stood in every election since 1998 to the devolved Northern Ireland Assembly until the 2011 election. He was first elected to the Assembly in 1998 polling 12.8% of the popular vote, in 2003, 20.9% of the popular vote, and in 2007, 14% of the popular vote. Empey also stood against DUP MP for East Belfast Peter Robinson in the 2005 Westminster election polling 30.1% of the vote but failing to get elected.

In the 2010 general election, Empey contested the South Antrim seat, but was defeated by the incumbent William McCrea for the DUP.

On 15 May 2010, Empey announced that he was to stand down in late 2010 as leader of the Ulster Unionist Party. In August 2010, he confirmed that he would resign as leader in September 2010.

House of Lords

On 19 November 2010, it was announced that Empey would be created a life peer and will sit as a Conservative in the House of Lords. On 15 January 2011, he was created Baron Empey, of Shandon in the City and Borough of Belfast, and took his seat supported by Lord Trimble and Lord Rogan.

As a supporter of Brexit, he voted in favour of triggering Article 50 in 2017.

References

|-

|-

|-

1947 births
Alumni of Queen's University Belfast
First Ministers of Northern Ireland
Knights Bachelor
Leaders of the Ulster Unionist Party
Living people
Lord Mayors of Belfast
Members of Belfast City Council
Members of the Northern Ireland Constitutional Convention
Members of the Northern Ireland Forum
Ministers of the Northern Ireland Executive (since 1999)
Northern Ireland MLAs 1998–2003
Northern Ireland MLAs 2003–2007
Northern Ireland MLAs 2007–2011
Officers of the Order of the British Empire
People educated at The Royal School, Armagh
Politicians awarded knighthoods
United Ulster Unionist Party politicians
Vanguard Unionist Progressive Party politicians
Ulster Unionist Party MLAs
Ulster Unionist Party life peers
Presbyterians from Northern Ireland
Life peers created by Elizabeth II